Lance Friesz (born September 16, 1983, in Mission Viejo, California) is a former soccer player.

Early life and soccer career
Friesz grew up in Laguna Niguel, California with his parents and younger sister, attended Dana Hills High School, and played college soccer at the University of San Diego. During his college years he played in the USL Premier Development League for both Boulder Rapids Reserve and Los Angeles Storm.

Friesz was drafted to play for Los Angeles Galaxy, where he was second reserve goalkeeper behind Joe Cannon and Steve Cronin, but he never saw any first team playing time and was waived at the end of 2007. Friesz made headlines during his time with Galaxy for being the team's lowest wage earner. According to a BBC report his then-teammate David Beckham earned 503.9 times more than him.

Friesz moved to the Republic of Ireland in 2008, and played for St. Patrick's Athletic, but was released at the end of the season having made just four first team appearances.

Friesz returned to the United States; since 2010 he has been playing for the Yorba Linda, California-based amateur team Pateadores SC in the USASA Coast Soccer League.

References

External links
St. Patrick's Athletic bio
http://www.letsmakeaplan.org/choose-a-cfp-professional/verify-a-cfp-professional/Details/?key=3f62df14-a800-4b11-a93b-294e65d18b06&LastName=Friesz&Page=1

1983 births
Living people
Soccer players from California
Colorado Rapids U-23 players
LA Laguna FC players
LA Galaxy players
St Patrick's Athletic F.C. players
American expatriate soccer players
League of Ireland players
San Diego Toreros men's soccer players
Sportspeople from Mission Viejo, California
USL League Two players
People from Laguna Niguel, California
American soccer players
Association football goalkeepers
Expatriate association footballers in the Republic of Ireland